Nièr beurre ("black butter" in Jèrriais) is a type of apple butter, a preserve of apples, that is part of the cuisine and culture of Jersey. 

Nièr beurre is made of apples cooked in cider.  The cider is reduced to a syrup before the apples are added. After some hours of cooking, sugar is added and the mixture seasoned with lemons, liquorice and allspice.

See also
 List of spreads

References

Apple dishes
Spreads (food)
Jersey culture
British cuisine
Cider